Azolla mexicana, the Mexican mosquito fern, is an aquatic fern native to Mexico, British Columbia and the western United States (California, Oregon, Washington, Arizona, New Mexico, Texas, Utah, and Nevada).

There are reports of the species also occurring in the Great Plains of the central United States, but these reports need further study for verification.

Description
Azolla mexicana is a floating aquatic with blue-green to dark red leaves. It is distinguished from the two other species of the genus present in North America, Azolla caroliniana and Azolla filiculoides, by having multicellular hairs on the leaves and pits on the megaspores.

References

Salviniales
Freshwater plants
Flora of North America
Flora of Central America
Flora of South America
Plants described in 1845
Ferns of the Americas